Daesh is the Arabic acronym for the Islamic State of Iraq and the Levant, a Salafi jihadist terrorist and militant group.

Daesh may also refer to:
A nickname for the invasive species of blue crab Portunus segnis

See also
Daish (surname)
Desh (disambiguation)